Tapinoma epinotale is a species of ant in the genus Tapinoma. Described by Karavaiev in 1935, the species is endemic to Vietnam.

References

Tapinoma
Hymenoptera of Asia
Insects described in 1935